ABS Aircraft AG is a Swiss aircraft manufacturer, building Fournier-designed motorgliders. It was founded in Küsnacht in 1985.

References
ICAO listing

Aircraft manufacturers of Switzerland